Scymnus coniferarum, the conifer lady beetle, is a species of dusky lady beetle in the family Coccinellidae. It is found in western North America.

S. coniferarum is being evaluated as a potential biological control for the Hemlock woolly adelgid infestation of the eastern hemlock on the east coast.

References

Further reading

 

Coccinellidae
Articles created by Qbugbot
Beetles described in 1797